Menegazzia eperforata is a species of foliose lichen found in New Zealand and Australia.

See also
List of Menegazzia species

References

eperforata
Lichen species
Lichens described in 1983
Lichens of Australia
Lichens of New Zealand
Taxa named by David Galloway (botanist)
Taxa named by Peter Wilfred James